Christopher Blevins (born March 14, 1998) is an American cyclist, who currently rides for UCI Mountain Bike Team . Specializing in cross-country mountain biking, Blevins has also previously competed in road cycling (for ) and cyclo-cross, before choosing to solely focus on mountain biking in preparation for the 2020 Summer Olympics.

Biography

Early life
Blevins was born on March 14, 1998, in Durango, Colorado, son of Field and Priscilla His father is an orthopedic surgeon with a specialty in sports medicine and his older sister Kaylee was also a member of the U.S. National mountain bike team. He went to college in San Luis Obispo, CA graduating from Cal Poly in 2021 with a degree in business administration with a concentration in entrepreneurship. Additionally, he teaches voluntarily spoken-word poetry in a local juvenile hall and is a lyricist of rap music.

Career
Blevins began participating in the sport of cycling at the age of five by competing in BMX races. He managed to win eight national championships in the age divisions between elementary and high school. His BMX career ended at the age of sixteen however, and by the age of twelve he had already begun to compete in both mountain bike and road cycling. He had great success from the ages of thirteen to nineteen where he won the national Cross Country championship in his age group. At sixteen he was able to win the road cycling national championship as well.

When Blevins became eighteen he won one of the most important races of the junior category in road cycling, the famous Course de la Paix. This race provided him the opportunity to join the team . In the same year, he signed another contract with the Specialized Racing team to participate in the U23 World Cross-Country Championship. In 2018 he managed to win the U23 national cyclo-cross championship. In the same age group, he finished 2nd in the World Cross-Country Championship and also won a stage of the Tour of the Gila. In 2019, aiming for the 2020 Olympics in Tokyo, he decided to dedicate himself to mountain biking. At the 2020 U23 World Cross-Country Championship he finished 2nd and after the postponing of the Olympic Games due to COVID-19, he signed a 2021 contract with Trinity Racing.

In August 2021, he became the inaugural men's cross-country short track world champion, taking the title at the 2021 UCI Mountain Bike World Championships in Val di Sole, Italy.

Major results

Mountain Bike

2015
 2nd  Team relay, Pan American Championships
2016
 1st  Cross-country, National Junior Championships
2017
 1st  Cross-country, National Under-23 Championships
2018
 2nd  Cross-country, UCI World Under-23 Championships
 3rd Cross-country, National Championships
2019
 Pan American Championships
1st  Under-23 Cross-country
2nd  Team relay
 2nd  Team relay, UCI World Championships
2020
 2nd  Cross-country, UCI World Under-23 Championships
 3rd Overall UCI Under-23 XCO World Cup
2nd Nové Město II
2021
 UCI World Championships
1st  Short track
2nd  Team relay
 UCI XCO World Cup
1st Snowshoe
 3rd  Cross-country, UCI World E-MTB Championships
2022
 UCI XCC World Cup
1st Snowshoe
 2nd Cross-country, National Championships
 3rd  Team relay, UCI World Championships
 3rd Overall Cape Epic (with Matthew Beers)
2023
 1st Prologue Cape Epic (with Matthew Beers)

Road

2015
 1st Stage 4 Tour de l'Abitibi
 6th Overall Trofeo Karlsberg
1st  Mountains classification
2016
 1st  Overall Course de la Paix Juniors
2018
 4th Overall San Dimas Stage Race
1st Stage 2
 9th Overall Tour of the Gila
1st  Points classification
1st Stage 2

Cyclo-cross
2014–2015
 3rd  Pan American Junior Championships
2017–2018
 1st  National Under-23 Championships
 Under-23 CXLA Weekend
1st Day 1 & 2
2021–2022
 USCX Series
3rd Baltimore Day 2

References

External links
 
 

1998 births
Living people
American male cyclists
Cyclo-cross cyclists
People from Durango, Colorado
American mountain bikers
Cyclists at the 2020 Summer Olympics
Olympic cyclists of the United States
Cyclists from Colorado